Gloria Ugarte was an Argentine film and television actress. She often played vampish roles. Ugarte was married to the actors Zerpa Fabio and Mario Faig.

Partial filmography
 Del cuplé al tango (1958)
 La Casa de Madame Lulù (1968)
 Custodio de señoras (1979)
 Amante para dos (1981)

References

Bibliography 
 Vega, Hugo F. Televisión Argentina: 1951-1975: La Información. Ediciones del Jilguero, 2001.

External links

 

Year of birth missing
1995 deaths
Argentine film actresses
Argentine television actresses
20th-century Argentine actresses
Burials at La Chacarita Cemetery